Børge Gissel (7 July 1915 – 6 April 2002) was a Danish cyclist. He competed in the team pursuit event at the 1948 Summer Olympics.

References

1915 births
2002 deaths
Danish male cyclists
Olympic cyclists of Denmark
Cyclists at the 1948 Summer Olympics
Sportspeople from Aarhus